Emilio Gómez was the defending champion and successfully defended his title, defeating Nicolas Moreno de Alboran 6–7(2–7), 7–6(7–4), 7–5 in the final.

Seeds

Draw

Finals

Top half

Bottom half

References

External links
Main draw
Qualifying draw

Salinas Challenger - 1